Internal Security Act may refer to:

Internal Security Act 1960, former Malaysian law
Internal Security Act (Singapore)
McCarran Internal Security Act, a United States federal law
Suppression of Communism Act, 1950, a South African law, renamed the "Internal Security Act" in 1976
Internal Security Act, 1982, a South African law